Chad Bugeja (born 28 April 1981 in Broken Hill, New South Wales, Australia) is a former Australian professional footballer.

Biography
He played as a striker for Adelaide United in the A-League's inaugural season, but was released in the close season. He was with White City until the 2008 super league season and was transferred to Adelaide City FC. He later moved to Adelaide Blue Eagles for the 2010 season, scoring 10 goals in the pre-season cup. By 2013, Bugeja split coaching and playing duties with Blue Eagles. He then joined Murray United in Melbourne and after 3 years he moved back to Adelaide to play for Brahma Lodge. He currently plays for Modbury Vista SC in the State League 2.

See also
Bugeja (surname)

References

1981 births
Living people
People from Broken Hill, New South Wales
Association football forwards
Australian soccer players
A-League Men players
FFSA Super League players
Adelaide United FC players
FK Beograd (Australia) players
National Premier Leagues players
Sportsmen from New South Wales
Soccer players from New South Wales